Rainbow Heights is a district in Tampa, Florida.

References

See also 

 Neighborhoods in Tampa, Florida

Neighborhoods in Tampa, Florida